The Museum of Rail Travel at Ingrow, England is operated by the Vintage Carriages Trust (VCT), a charity based just north of Ingrow (West) railway station on the Keighley and Worth Valley Railway in West Yorkshire.  Founded in 1965, it became a registered charity in 1981 and opened in 1990.

The Trust has provided railway carriages for over 70 films and television programmes.

Two of the steam locomotives owned by VCT - "Sir Berkeley" and "Bellerophon" have visited railways in the Netherlands. "Bellerophon" has also visited Belgium.  "Sir Berkeley" is on loan to the Middleton Railway, Leeds. A third locomotive, Lord Mayor, an 0-4-0 saddle tank steam locomotive is on static display in the museum.

The VCT Collection

Carriages
The Vintage Carriages Trust owns the following carriages:
 Manchester Sheffield & Lincolnshire Railway four-wheeled tri-composite no. 176, built 1876
 Midland Railway composite no. 357, built 1886
 Great Northern Railway brake third no. 589, built 1888 
 Great Northern Railway brake composite no. 2856, built 1898
 Metropolitan Railway brake third no. 427, built 1910
 Metropolitan Railway third no. 465, built 1919
 Metropolitan Railway first no. 509, built 1923
 Southern Railway brake third no. 3554, built 1924
 British Railways Bulleid design third no. 1469, built 1950

Road vehicles 
Until early 2008, the museum was also home to a 1948 Scammell "mechanical horse", on loan from Tate & Lyle. This lorry attracted media attention in July 2002 when the museum received a speeding ticket, from Greater Manchester Police, claiming that the three-wheel vehicle had been caught speeding at 44 miles per hour in a 30 mph zone – when in fact it has a maximum speed of only 18 mph. (It was a case of mistaken identity: a Belgian car with the same number plate has been caught on camera in Bolton).  Museum bosses were pleased to be able to show CCTV footage in its defence – at the time of the incident it was in pieces in the Museum's workshops.

After a lengthy restoration into LNER blue livery, the mechanical horse and a matching trailer left Ingrow for pastures new in June 2008.

References

External links 
 Vintage Carriages Trust website
 Filming credits
 Scammell "Mechanical Horse" at Ingrow, including photo
 

Museums in the City of Bradford
Transport in the City of Bradford
Railway museums in England
Buildings and structures in Keighley
Keighley and Worth Valley Railway